The 2007 K3 League was the first season of amateur K3 League. It consisted of two regular stage and final playoffs. The winners of each stage and the top two clubs of the overall table qualified for the league playoffs and the 2008 Korean FA Cup.

Regular season

First stage

Second stage

Overall table

Top scorers

Championship playoffs

Bracket

Semi-finals

Final 

Seoul United won 3–0 on aggregate.

Final table

See also 
2007 in South Korean football

References

External links 
RSSSF

K3 League (2007–2019) seasons
K3 League, 2007
2007 in South Korean football